Gabriel Abeiku Dadzie (born 6 March 1997) is a footballer who plays as a striker for ASAS Djibouti Télécom. Born in Ghana, he is a Djibouti international.

Career

In 2016, Radzie signed for Ivorian side Stade d'Abidjan. In 2020, he signed for Arta/Solar7 in Djibouti, helping them win two consecutive league titles, their first league titles. He was the top scorer of the 2020–21 Djibouti Premier League and 2021–22 Djibouti Premier League with 26 goals and 18 goals.

References

External links

 

1997 births
Living people
Association football forwards
Djiboutian footballers
Djibouti international footballers
Ghanaian footballers
Ghanaian emigrants to Djibouti
AS Arta/Solar7 players
Djibouti Premier League players
Djiboutian expatriate footballers
Expatriate footballers in Djibouti
Expatriate footballers in Ivory Coast
Ghanaian expatriate footballers
Ghanaian expatriate sportspeople in Ivory Coast
Stade d'Abidjan players